Hannah is an unincorporated community in Florence County, South Carolina, United States. The nearest town is Pamplico. It is best known as the home of country music singer Josh Turner.

See also
 Lynches River

References

Unincorporated communities in Florence County, South Carolina
Unincorporated communities in South Carolina